Multi-sketch is an animation method of story-telling where a sequence of hand-drawn sketches are created simultaneously while narrating it with voice. To achieve this a Tablet PC or digitizing tablet can be used to create improvised progressive line sketches which are captured to video.

Such types of cartoons are created in a freestyle unscripted manner, which makes them original, since the whole cartoon does not need editing after it is completed. The final multi-sketch can be sent to various video formats.

References

Drawing
Animation techniques